The LaserJet 4000 series is Hewlett-Packard's medium-duty monochrome laser printer range and the successor to the LaserJet 5 series.

The LaserJet 4000 series, like most of Hewlett-Packard's laser printer series, follow the standard nomenclature for denoting factory-included features.

 n = network ready
 t = twin/two (smaller in some models) paper trays
 d = duplex/double sided printing
 s = stacker for output tray
 l = stapler.

Further accessories could also be purchased if the desired functions didn't come factory fitted on the model purchased. For example, network cards, additional trays and duplexing units are the most commonly found.

LaserJet 4000

The LaserJet 4000/4050 and their respective variants were the first printers released in the 4000 series. The LaserJet 4000 series printers print letter paper at 17 pages per minute, and can be set to print at 600 dpi or 1200 dpi, although when set to print at true 1200 dpi, the printer runs at reduced speed. These printers may be connected to a computer using either the serial port, parallel port or Ethernet ( for the network capable "N" series ). The LaserJet 4000 series was introduced in November 1997 and was discontinued in May 1999. They are powered by a NEC VR4300 CPU

LaserJet 4100

The HP LaserJet 4100 series were replacements for the HP LaserJet 4000/4050 series of printers. The LaserJet 4100 series printers print letter paper at 25 pages per minute, and can be set to print at 600 dpi or 1200 dpi. Unlike the 4000 and 4050 series, the 4100 series printers are capable of printing at true 1200 dpi at full engine speed. These printers may be connected to a computer using either the serial port, parallel port or Ethernet ( for the network capable "N"series" ). The LaserJet 4100 series was introduced in March 2001 and was discontinued in February 2003. The 4100MFP, however, was introduced in March 2002, and discontinued in August 2006. They are all powered by a PMC-Sierra RM5261 CPU

LaserJet 4200

The HP LaserJet 4200 series were replacements for the HP LaserJet 4100 series of printers. They were introduced in December 2002 together with the HP LaserJet 4300 series. All models except the 4200 and 4200dtn were discontinued in June 2005, the latter being discontinued in November 2005.

The HP 4200 series of printers consists of the following

 4200
 4200n
 4200tn
 4200dtn
 4200dtns
 4200dtnsl.

The base model, the 4200, has the following specifications: 48 MB of memory, parallel port connection and a 600 sheet paper tray. All the others with factory-installed features as indicated above have 64 MB of memory.

They are all powered by a PMC-Sierra RM7065A CPU running at 300 MHz. This is a 64 bit processor based on the MIPS architecture. The printing engine is manufactured by Canon.

This series of printers can handle PCL, PostScript, HP-GL/2 and PJL print languages.

LaserJet 4300

The LaserJet 4300 series are a faster version of the LaserJet 4200n series of printers.
The HP 4300 series of printers consists of the following

 4300
 4300n
 4300tn
 4300dtn
 4300dtns
 4300dtnsl.

The base model, the 4300, has the following specifications: 64MB of memory, parallel port connection and a 600 sheet paper tray. All the others with factory-installed features as indicated above have 80MB of memory.

They are all powered by a PMC-Sierra RM7065A CPU running at 350 MHz. This is a 64 bit processor based on the MIPS architecture.

This series can handle PCL, PostScript, HP-GL/2 and PJL print languages.

Comparison

1 = 4200 and 4200dtn were discontinued in November 2005, all other models were discontinued in June 2005
2 = 4240 model is essentially identical to both the 4250 and 4350 models; firmware or microcode on formatter board and/or motor controller board is different so that the printer will not allow the use of  
"42X" (approx. 20,000 page capacity) toners; only lower capacity toners, such as the "42A" (approx. 10,000 pages) are permitted. Printing speed is specified as 3 pages/minute slower than the 4250.
3 = See External links below for information regarding the differences between these models

References

External links
 HP Laserjet Introduction & Discontinuation Dates
 LaserJet 4240, 4250 and 4350 Series Printers - Product Specifications
 4240/4250/4350 Formatter, DC Motor Controller information (re-installation guide, but linked here for the useful information on model differences)

4000 series
Computer-related introductions in 1997